Magda Jóna (14 August 1934 – 15 April 1993) was a Hungarian handballer who played for Győri Vasas, Újpesti Gyapjú and Budapesti Spartacus SC. She was capped for the Hungarian field handball national team once in 1956, and played for the country's handball national team 44 times between 1955 and 1966.

On club level she won the Hungarian Championship five times (1959, 1963, 1964, 1965, 1967) and reached the final of the European Champions Cup in 1965, just to fall short against HG København.

With the national team she participated in three World Championships (1957, 1962, 1965), winning the tournament in 1965 and collecting a silver medal in 1957.

References
 Kozák, Péter (1995). Ki kicsoda a magyar sportéletben?, vol. II. (I–R). Szekszárd: Babits Kiadó. .

1934 births
1993 deaths
Handball players from Budapest
Hungarian female handball players
Győri Audi ETO KC players
20th-century Hungarian women